Rūta Vanagaitė (born January 25, 1955) is a Lithuanian theatre critic, writer, public relations specialist, journalist and a public figure of Vilnius. She is a controversial figure, mostly known for her efforts to raise public awareness about participation of Lithuanians in the Holocaust.

Biography 
Vanagaitė was born on January 25, 1955, in Šiauliai. From 1961 to 1972 she studied in secondary school no. 22 in Vilnius.

In 1978 she graduated from the Russian Institute of Theatre Arts where she studied drama, and began publishing her theatre review articles before graduation. In 1978 she was appointed head of the theatre, cinema and TV section in  monthly magazine, and later worked at the Literatūra ir menas newspaper. From 1985 to 1989, she lived in Helsinki where she worked in the library of the University of Helsinki and wrote articles on social and cultural topics for Helsingin Sanomat newspaper.

In 1989, she returned to Lithuania and became the art director of the National Youth Theatre. Since 1991 she was organizing annually the international theatre festival LIFE. In 1999—2001 she was an advisor to prime minister Rolandas Paksas on culture and communication. In 2001 she founded a public relations agency Acta Publica. Since 2006, she is a director of Vilko valia agency.

In 2015, she met Efraim Zuroff who discussed with her the extermination of the Lithuanian Jews during the Holocaust. This was the beginning of her work on writing the book Mūsiškiai. Kelionė su priešu (Our People. A Journey with the Enemy), which was published a year later, and was translated into multiple languages (English, Polish, Russian, Hebrew). The book discusses the problem of participation of common Lithuanians in the execution of Jews and robbing of their property, a topic very much unpopular in the modern Lithuania. She claims to have been shunned by some of her relatives and friends after the publication of the book.

She self published a book in cooperation with German historian Christoph Dieckmann  about the Holocaust How Did It Happen?, which is expected to be published in US 2021.

Apart from her native Lithuanian, she is fluent in Russian, English, Finnish, Polish Hebrew and French

False claims about A. Ramanauskas–Vanagas ("The Hawk") 
Vanagaitė's false claims about the leader of Lithuanian Forest brothers Adolfas Ramanauskas–Vanagas (nicknamed "The Hawk") caused vast scandal in the country. According to her, after reading his KGB file, she found that in the partisan's last speech he was hailing the USSR, that he had self-injured, punctured his own eye and cut his own genitals. Vanagaitė also claimed he was a KGB agent. The claims were supported by her lifelong partner Efraim Zuroff, who accused The Hawk of taking part in The Holocaust, because he read so in the diaries of his main persecutor and torturer Nachamn Dushanski.

Reaction in Lithuania 
The claims were immediately rebuffed by numerous historians and social activists as being confessed under brutal torture (which at the time was already illegal even in the USSR), condition of coma, at some moments even physically unable to write his signature. The Hawk's biographer historian Arvydas Anušauskas observed that it's "no surprise to hear such claims from a person who has never researched history", is unaware of how such cases are made, how they're falsified and censured to fit the dictatorial regime.

Vanagaitė's publisher Alma littera announced that they are withdrawing her books from the market. 

The Lithuanian General Attorney's office also started an investigation which was later cancelled because of "no evidence that Vanagaitė intentionally spread false claims, therefore they should be assessed in ethical and not legal terms".

The Lithuanian Jewish Community announced they have no problem with a monument for The Hawk.

Reaction in Israel 
The ambassador of Israel Amir Maimon visited The Hawk's daughter, reassuring that Israel respects the Lithuanian fight for freedom and that the attacks by two people are "strictly their personal".

Vanagaitė's apology 
A week after her initial statements, R. Vanagaitė issued an apology for her "utterly misleading claims", based on the lies recorded in the KGB cases in an effort to conceal the traces of torture. She claims to be sorry to have been unaware of all the facts.

Selected publications 
 Pareigos metas. Vilnius: Alma littera, 2014. — 300 p.
 Ne bobų vasara. Vilnius: Alma littera, 2015. — 166 p.
 Jis. Vilnius: Alma littera, 2016. — 240 p.
 Mūsiškiai (co-authored with Efraim Zuroff) – translated in various languages: Our People (English), Nasi (Polish) etc.

Kaip tai įvyko? Christoph Dieckmann atsako Rūtai Vanagaitei. 2020
Renkuosi vasarą. 2021

References

External links 
 https://www.timesofisrael.com/topic/ruta-vanagaite/
 https://www.newyorker.com/news/our-columnists/how-a-single-remark-stole-a-lithuanian-writers-livelihood

Russian Academy of Theatre Arts alumni
Historians of the Holocaust
Lithuanian women writers
Living people
1955 births